WRBB (104.9 FM) is a radio station broadcasting a variety format, run by the students of Northeastern University. Licensed to Boston, Massachusetts, United States, it serves the Greater Boston area. The station is owned by Northeastern and transmits from its main Boston campus. The station is funded through the Northeastern Student Activities fee.

The station airs over 100 music and talk programs during a typical semester, encompassing a large variety of musical and topical genres. In addition, all major Northeastern hockey, basketball, and baseball games are also broadcast live. Despite its signal coverage within Boston, its 104.9 frequency collides with nearby WNKC, which covers the North Shore area.

History
The station went on the air on December 13, 1962, as carrier current outlet WNEU, broadcasting only to two dorm buildings on campus. In September 1970, the station began FM broadcasting as WRBB on 91.7 MHz. In 1982, the frequency changed to the current 104.9, due to interference from other stations and FCC rulings.

The station was one of the first college radio stations in the country to broadcast hip-hop music during the early 1980s.

On December 12, 2014, the station played the Oasis song "Don't Look Back in Anger" for 5 hours continuously in what was believed to be an apparent loop glitch. This was followed by one play of "Wonderwall", after which the stream returned to the original song. This was later inferred to be a reference to a popular John Mulaney sketch.

Notable alumni
 Wendy Williams – television personality, host of The Wendy Williams Show

References

External links
Official site
WRBB Sports website

Current and past playlists on WRBB
Student Activities records including info on WRBB

RBB
Radio stations established in 1962
RBB
Northeastern University
1962 establishments in Massachusetts